Sviridova is a rural locality in Dyakonovsky Selsoviet Rural Settlement, Oktyabrsky District, Kursk Oblast, Russia. Population:

Geography 
The village is located on the Vorobzha River (a left tributary of the Seym River), 68 km from the Russia–Ukraine border, 20 km south-west of Kursk, 7 km south-west of the district center – the urban-type settlement Pryamitsyno, 5 km from the selsoviet center – Dyakonovo.

 Climate
Sviridova has a warm-summer humid continental climate (Dfb in the Köppen climate classification).

Transport 
Sviridova is located 10 km from the federal route  Crimea Highway (a part of the European route ), 1.5 km from the road of regional importance  ("Crimea Highway" – Ivanino, part of the European route ), 5.5 km from the road  (Dyakonovo – Sudzha – border with Ukraine), on the road of intermunicipal significance  (38K-004 – a part of a selo Dyakonovo: 4th Okolotok), 8 km from the nearest railway station Dyakonovo (railway line Lgov I — Kursk).

The rural locality is situated 31 km from Kursk Vostochny Airport, 112 km from Belgorod International Airport and 229 km from Voronezh Peter the Great Airport.

References

Notes

Sources

Rural localities in Oktyabrsky District, Kursk Oblast